The 2003–04 Cypriot Fourth Division was the 19th season of the Cypriot fourth-level football league. Othellos Athienou won their 1st title.

Format
Fourteen teams participated in the 2003–04 Cypriot Fourth Division. All teams played against each other twice, once at their home and once away. The team with the most points at the end of the season crowned champions. The first three teams were promoted to the 2004–05 Cypriot Third Division and the last three teams were relegated to regional leagues.

Point system
Teams received three points for a win, one point for a draw and zero points for a loss.

Changes from previous season
Teams promoted to 2003–04 Cypriot Third Division
 Orfeas Nicosia
 Ethnikos Latsion FC
 AEK Kythreas

Teams relegated from 2002–03 Cypriot Third Division
 Othellos Athienou
 Achyronas Liopetriou
 Elia Lythrodonta

Teams promoted from regional leagues
 ENAD Polis Chrysochous
 Spartakos Kitiou
 THOI Filias

Teams relegated to regional leagues
 Rotsidis Mammari
 PEFO Olympiakos

League standings

Results

See also
 Cypriot Fourth Division
 2003–04 Cypriot First Division
 2003–04 Cypriot Cup

Sources

Cypriot Fourth Division seasons
Cyprus
2003–04 in Cypriot football